Iván Hevesy (7 December 1893 29 January 1966) was a Hungarian literature, photography and film theorist. Hevesy is best known for his pioneering role in the history of the Hungarian avant-garde.

References

1893 births
Hungarian art critics
1966 deaths
Hungarian film critics